Sidney Blunt (13 April 1902 – 1965) was an English footballer who played in the Football League for Port Vale.

Career
Blunt began his career with his hometown club Wolverhampton Wanderers, but never appeared for their first team. He had spells at Worcester City, Bilston United and Lichfield City, before joining Port Vale in May 1924. He played 36 Second Division and three FA Cup games in the 1924–25 season, and scored one goal in a 4–2 win over Clapton Orient at The Old Recreation Ground on 21 March. He appeared 26 times in the 1925–26 campaign, and suffered a double fracture of his leg in a 3–0 home win over Swansea Town on 13 March. He could not regain his first team place upon his recovery and instead was given a free transfer in May 1928. Blunt later played for Shrewsbury Town and Hereford United.

Career statistics
Source:

References

1902 births
1965 deaths
People from Bilston
English footballers
Association football defenders
Wolverhampton Wanderers F.C. players
Worcester City F.C. players
Bilston Town F.C. players
Lichfield City F.C. players
Port Vale F.C. players
Shrewsbury Town F.C. players
Hereford United F.C. players
English Football League players